John Michael Drew (17 October 1865 – 17 July 1947) was an Australian politician who served as a member of the Western Australian Legislative Council for 41 years in two separate terms between 1900 and his death in 1947. Born at Wanerenooka, Northampton, Western Australia, Drew established and edited several newspapers circulating in the Geraldton region before entering politics. A strong opponent of federation, he was elected to the Legislative Council in 1900. Nominally independent, Drew aligned himself with the Labor Party, and served in several Labor ministries during the early 1900s, in positions such as Minister for Agriculture, Minister for Lands, and Colonial Secretary. He officially joined the party in 1911, having been admitted to caucus sittings the previous year. During World War I, Drew supported conscription, but this issue, coupled with the ineffectual Scaddan Ministry, led to him losing his seat at the 1918 election. He regained his seat at the 1924 election, and subsequently served as chief secretary of the party, as well as Minister for Education, Health, and the North-West. Drew died of cancer in 1947, and was buried at Karrakatta Cemetery.

References

1865 births
1947 deaths
Australian newspaper editors
Australian newspaper founders
Australian newspaper publishers (people)
Deaths from cancer in Western Australia
Journalists from Western Australia
Members of the Western Australian Legislative Council
People from Northampton, Western Australia
Burials at Karrakatta Cemetery
Australian Labor Party members of the Parliament of Western Australia
Independent members of the Parliament of Western Australia